Henry Bennett (September 29, 1808 – May 10, 1868) was an American lawyer and politician who served five terms as a United States representative from New York from 1849 to 1959.

Biography
Bennett was born in New Lisbon, Otsego County, New York on September 29, 1808, where he attended public schools. He married Polly Maria Gibson.

Career
Bennett studied law, was admitted to the bar in 1832 and practiced law in New Berlin, Chenango County, New York. He served as clerk of the town of New Berlin in 1846.

Congress 
Elected as a Whig to the Thirty-first through the Thirty-third Congresses, Bennett was elected a member of the Opposition Party to the Thirty-fourth. He was elected as a Republican to the Thirty-fifth Congress, thereby serving from March 4, 1849 until March 3, 1859. He was the chairman of the Committee on Public Lands in the Thirty-fourth Congress.

Later career 
In 1858 Bennett unsuccessfully sought renomination to the Thirty-sixth Congress, and resumed the practice of law in New Berlin, until his death.

Death
Bennett died in New Berlin, Chenango County, New York, on May 10, 1868 (age 59 years, 224 days). He is interred at St. Andrews' Cemetery, New Berlin, New York.

References

External links
 

1808 births
1874 deaths
People from Otsego County, New York
New York (state) Whigs
Whig Party members of the United States House of Representatives
Opposition Party members of the United States House of Representatives from New York (state)
Republican Party members of the United States House of Representatives from New York (state)
19th-century American politicians